The 2010 Caribbean Twenty20 season was the debut season of the Caribbean Twenty20, established by the West Indies Cricket Board in 2010. The season was held in Barbados and Trinidad between 22 and 31 July 2010. It featured all seven West Indies first-class cricket domestic teams and one overseas team – Canada.

The competition started with a group stage, in which the teams are divided into two groups of four. Each group competed in a round robin and those matches were followed by two semi-finals, a third-place playoff and a final. The top domestic team from the tournament will qualify for the 2010 Champions League Twenty20.

Guyana won the tournament, defeating Barbados in the final by one wicket with one ball remaining. Trinidad and Tobago came third and Jamaica came fourth. The tournament was greatly affected by the weather conditions at the venues. Out of the eight games played in Trinidad, three matches were abandoned and three matches – including a semi-final and the third-place playoff – were shortened due to heavy rain.

Background 
The previous domestic Twenty20 tournament held by the West Indies Cricket Board was the Stanford 20/20, which ended in 2008 after its sponsor Allen Stanford was charged with fraud and arrested in June 2009. The creation of the Caribbean Twenty20 tournament coincides with the 2010 Champions League Twenty20 tournament, which starts less than two months after. The top domestic team from the tournament will qualify for the Champions League as the sole representative of the West Indies. They will be the tenth and last team to qualify, as all other teams qualified before May 2010.

Cricket in the West Indies was at a time of decline, indicated by the criticism received when they hosted the 2007 Cricket World Cup and the failure of the Stanford 20/20. With the slogan "Bring It Back", the Caribbean Twenty20 was an attempt to revitalise interest in the sport with a focus on the Twenty20 format, which was popular amongst audiences in the 18–34 age-group. This follows the success of the Trinidad and Tobago national cricket team at the 2009 Champions League Twenty20, where they were runners-up, and the West Indies' successful hosting of the 2010 ICC World Twenty20.

Venues 
All matches were played at the following two grounds:

Format 
The tournament consisted of 16 matches, and was divided into a group stage and a knockout stage. If a match ended in a tie, a Super Over would have been played to determine the winner. The group stage had the teams divided into two equal groups, with each playing a round-robin tournament. The top two teams of each group advanced to the knockout stage. The knockout stage consisted of two semi-finals, a third-place playoff and the grand final. The semi-finals had the top team of one group facing the second from the other. The winners of the semi-finals played in the grand final to determine the winner of the competition, while the losers of the semi-finals played the third-place playoff.

Points in the group stage were awarded as follows:

Prize money 
The total prize money for the competition was US$53,000. The most man of the match in each of the 16 matches received $500 and a plaque. The prize money was be distributed as follows:

 $4,000 – Fourth place
 $6,000 – Third place
 $10,000 – Runners-up
 $25,000 – Winners

Teams 

Zone A
  (overseas team)
 
  Leeward Islands
 

Zone B
 
  Combined Campuses and Colleges
 
  Windward Islands

Results

Group stage

Zone A

Zone B

Knockout stage

Fixtures 
All times shown are in Eastern Caribbean Time (UTC−04).

Group stage

Zone A

Zone B

Knockout stage 
Semi-finals

Third-place playoff

Final

Television coverage

See also 
 Stanford 20/20

References

External links 
 2010 Caribbean T20 website on the West Indies Cricket Board Official Website
 CricInfo Caribbean T20 website

C
Caribbean Twenty20
2010–11 West Indian cricket season